Francis Kaboré is a Burkina Faso professional footballer, who plays as a forward for Santos FC and the Burkina Faso national football team.

International career
In January 2014, coach Brama Traore, invited him to be a part of the Burkina Faso squad for the 2014 African Nations Championship. The team was eliminated in the group stages after losing to  Uganda and Zimbabwe and then drawing with Morocco.

References

External References

Living people
Burkinabé footballers
2014 African Nations Championship players
Burkina Faso A' international footballers
Santos FC Ouagadougou footballers
1994 births
African Games silver medalists for Burkina Faso
African Games medalists in football
Association football forwards
Competitors at the 2015 African Games
21st-century Burkinabé people